Juraj Majdan (born 20 August 1991) is a Slovak professional ice hockey player currently playing for HK Spišská Nová Ves of the Slovak Extraliga.

He played in the Czech Extraliga with HC Litvínov from 2009 to 2015. He also played for Slovak teams HC '05 Banská Bystrica, HKM Zvolen, HK Poprad and HK Nitra. He joined HC Košice on May 29, 2019.

Career statistics

Regular season and playoffs

International

References

External links

1991 births
Living people
HC '05 Banská Bystrica players
HK 36 Skalica players
HC Košice players
HC Litvínov players
HC Most players
HK Nitra players
People from Dubnica nad Váhom
Sportspeople from the Trenčín Region
HK Poprad players
Slovak ice hockey forwards
HC Slovan Ústečtí Lvi players
HKM Zvolen players
HK Dukla Michalovce players
HC Nové Zámky players
VHK Vsetín players
HK Spišská Nová Ves players
Slovak expatriate ice hockey players in the Czech Republic